MetaLab is an interface design firm headquartered in Victoria, British Columbia, that provides product design, engineering, and research services. Their clients include Slack, Google, Uber, and Amazon.

The MetaLab Was founded in 2006 by Andrew Wilkinson and is now part of the Tiny group of companies which include Dribbble, Pixel Union, and Flow. MetaLab also founded Pixel Union, a theme supplier for platforms including Tumblr, Shopify, and WordPress.

Products
MetaLab has created the following products:

Ballpark is an online application which allows sending invoices, receiving payments, and bidding on projects.
Flow is a task management platform to create, organize, discuss, and accomplish tasks. In March of 2011, MetaLab announced the launch of Flow for the web, iPhone, and iPad. A redesign of Flow was released on 25 September 2013.
Pixel Union is a collaboration between MetaLab and 45royale that creates curated internet themes for webpages and platforms.

Mozilla
In March 2010, Andrew Wilkinson (cofounder of MetaLab) wrote a blog post claiming that Mozilla "literally copied images straight off of our site" for use in the design of their FlightDeck editor. The story, which was picked up by TechCrunch, caused Mozilla to tell Wilkinson that "[the] design which used [MetaLab's] site’s design elements was a development build and according to [Mozilla] the design has been changed in newer builds." Wilkinson then requested a public apology.

References

External links
 Official website

Design companies of Canada
Companies based in Victoria, British Columbia
Companies established in 2006